William Franklin Strowd (December 7, 1832 – December 12, 1911) was a Populist U.S. Congressman from North Carolina between 1895 and 1899.

Strowd was born near Chapel Hill, North Carolina in 1832 and attended local schools. A farmer, he was a private in the Confederate Army during the American Civil War.

Strowd was a member of the North Carolina Constitution Convention of 1875. In 1892, he unsuccessfully sought election as a Populist to the U.S. House. In 1894, he succeeded, and served two terms in Washington, D.C., in the 54th and 55th Congresses. He did not seek renomination in 1898, and died in 1911 in Chapel Hill, where he is buried.

References
US Congress Biography

1832 births
1911 deaths
People from Chapel Hill, North Carolina
People's Party members of the United States House of Representatives from North Carolina
North Carolina Populists
Confederate States Army soldiers
People of North Carolina in the American Civil War
19th-century American politicians
Members of the United States House of Representatives from North Carolina